PFL 2 may refer to the following events from the Professional Fighters League:

 PFL 2 (2018 season)
 PFL 2 (2019 season)
 PFL 2 (2021 season)

See also 
 PFL (disambiguation)